The biodiversity of Great Britain and Ireland is one of the most well-studied geographical areas of its size in the world. This biota work  has resulted in the publication of distribution atlases for many taxonomic groups. This page lists these publications.

A full atlas is generally regarded as a definitive work on distribution, whereas a provisional atlas is typically produced as an interim stage to show survey progress.

One of the bodies responsible for publishing a great number of distribution atlases is the Institute of Terrestrial Ecology. Each atlas presents 10 km² distribution maps for the species within its scope. Maps typically use different symbols to signify records from differing time-periods - solid symbols for 10-km squares (hectads) that have recent records, and unfilled symbols for 10-km squares for which only older records exist, according to a defined cut-off date.

The atlases are produced by the Biological Records Centre (BRC), which is run by the Institute of Terrestrial Ecology, part of the Centre for Ecology and Hydrology based at CEH Wallingford, Crowmarsh Gifford, Oxfordshire. The data used to produce the maps is gathered by volunteer biological recorders and collated by the BRC Recording Schemes.

The atlases fall into two groups:

 Main Atlases are commercially published books, presenting the current state of knowledge for well-recorded groups. They typically include text information about the species, and other supporting material such as analyses of trends. They are usually produced only where a well-established recording scheme has been in operation for a significant period of time, and the scheme organisers believe that the data represent a comprehensive picture of the distribution of each species.
 Provisional Atlases give recorders an indication of progress and illustrate early results. Some of the later ones are quite detailed and less "provisional" - for example the Hoverfly Atlas, which provides charts of flight-period as well as text, and the Atlas of Aquatic Bugs, which has biological information and identification aids for some of the animals.

Flora

Fauna

References

External links
 Biological Records Centre website

Biological literature
Florae (publication)
Biota of the British Isles
Natural history of Ireland
Natural history of the United Kingdom
Atlases